St. Nicholas Church in Potsdam is a Lutheran church under the Evangelical Church in Berlin, Brandenburg and Silesian Upper Lusatia of the Evangelical Church in Germany on the Old Market Square (Alter Markt) in Potsdam. The central plan building in the Classicist style and dedicated to Saint Nicholas was built to plans by Karl Friedrich Schinkel in the years 1830 to 1837. The tambour of the 77-metre-high church that towers above the roofs of the city was built later, from 1843 to 1850. Its construction was taken over by Ludwig Persius and, from 1845, Friedrich August Stüler.

Towards the end of the Second World War, the church was hit during the British air raid on Potsdam and subsequently badly damaged by Soviet artillery fire. After many years of rebuilding the church was re-consecrated in 1981 by the Evangelical Parish of St. Nicholas, Potsdam, and, today, is open to visitors. In addition to the normal church services, concert events are also held in the church.

Literature 
 Dietmar Beuchtel, Ursula Treichel: St. Nikolai in Potsdam. DKV-Kunstführer. Vol. 424,9. Deutscher Kunstverlag, Munich - Berlin 1999 (3rd ed.).
 Gemeindekirchenrat der Ev. St. Nikolai-Kirchen-Gemeinde Potsdam (ed.): St. Nikolai Potsdam. 150 Jahre unter der Kuppel. UNZE, Teltow 2000.
 Kuratorium der Nikolaikirche (Hrg.): St. Nikolai Potsdam - ein Rückblick anläßlich der Wiedereinweihung 1981. Potsdam 1981, W. Kreutzmann, Leipzig 1989.
  F. Wilhelm Riehl: Die St. Nikolai-Kirche in Potsdam, ihre Geschichte und gegenwärtige Gestalt. Mit einem Grundrisse der Kirche. Potsdam 1850.
 Waltraud Volk: Potsdam. Historische Straßen und Plätze heute. Verlag für Bauwesen, Berlin - Munich, 1993 (3rd ed.).  
 Atlas zur Zeitschrift für Bauwesen. Jg. III, Berlin 1853 Tafeln 1ff. ''Download at Central and State Library of Berlin

See also
Day of Potsdam

External links

 St. Nicholas Evangelical Parish, Potsdam

References

Churches in Potsdam
Heritage sites in Brandenburg
Churches completed in 1837
Tourist attractions in Potsdam
Lutheran churches in Germany
Rebuilt buildings and structures in Potsdam
Church buildings with domes
Karl Friedrich Schinkel buildings
Protestant churches in Brandenburg
1837 establishments in Germany
Neoclassical church buildings in Germany
Buildings and structures in Germany destroyed during World War II